Polyommatus alcestis is a butterfly of the family Lycaenidae. It was described by Hans Zerny in 1932. It is found in Turkey, Iran and the Levant.

Subspecies
Polyommatus alcestis alcestis (Asia Minor, Levant)
Polyommatus alcestis karacetinae (Lukhtanov & Dantchenko, 2002) (south-eastern Turkey: Hakkari, western Iran)

References

Butterflies described in 1932
Polyommatus
Butterflies of Asia